Persée is a digital library of open access, mostly French-language scholarly journals, established by the Ministry of National Education of France. The website launched in 2005. The resource is maintained by the École normale supérieure de Lyon, French National Centre for Scientific Research, and University of Lyon.

It is one of the largest francophone portals dedicated to human and social sciences, with about 600 000 documents freely available.

See also
 List of journals in Persee.fr (fr)
 Open access journal
 List of open access bibliographic databases (fr)

References

Bibliography

External links
 Official site

Full-text scholarly online databases
Internet properties established in 2005
French-language websites
Open access (publishing)